Vivian may refer to:
Vivian (name), a given name and also a surname

Toponyms 

 Vivian, Louisiana, U.S.
 Vivian, South Dakota, U.S.
 Vivian, West Virginia, U.S.
 Vivian Island, Nunavut, Canada
 Ballantrae, Ontario, a hamlet in Stouffville, Ontario, formerly known as Vivian

Other 

 Vivian (album), an album by Vivian Green
 Vivian (Paper Mario), a Paper Mario character
 Vivian & Sons, a British metallurgical and chemicals business based at Hafod, in the lower Swansea valley
 , an Empire F type coaster originally named Empire Farjeon, in service in Greece from 1966-87

See also 
 Saint-Vivien (disambiguation)
 Vivien (disambiguation)
 Vivienne, a female version of the name
 Viviana (disambiguation), a female version of the name
 Vivianite, a mineral
 Vyvyan, a variation of the surname